Cellana livescens is a species of sea snail, a marine gastropod mollusk in the family Nacellidae.

Description

Distribution
This marine species occurs off Madagascar, Aldabra and the Mascarene Basin.

References

 Taylor, J.D. (1973). Provisional list of the mollusca of Aldabra Atoll.
 Dautzenberg, Ph. (1923). Liste préliminaire des mollusques marins de Madagascar et description de deux espèces nouvelles. J. conchyliol. 68: 21–74
 Dautzenberg, Ph. (1929). Contribution à l'étude de la faune de Madagascar: Mollusca marina testacea. Faune des colonies françaises, III(fasc. 4). Société d'Editions géographiques, maritimes et coloniales: Paris. 321–636, plates IV-VII pp.
 Christiaens J. (1986) Notes sur quelques Patellidae (Gastropoda) de l'Océan Indien. Apex 1(4): 97–127

External links
 

Nacellidae
Gastropods described in 1855